The Women's field hockey Qualifying Tournament for the 2012 Summer Olympics were qualification tournaments that determined the final three spots for the 2012 Summer Olympics.

The three events were held in Belgium, India and Japan from February to May 2012.

Belgium, Japan and South Africa won the three tournaments, taking the final quotas for the Olympic Games.

Teams
Below is the list of 18 teams who participate in these qualifying tournaments:

 – Replaced by Austria

Qualifying 1

Results
All times are DST (UTC+5:30).

Preliminary round

Matches

Classification round

Fifth and sixth place

Third and fourth place

Final

Statistics

Awards

Final standings

Qualifying 2

Results
All times are CET (UTC+01:00).

Preliminary round

Matches

Classification round

Fifth and sixth place

Third and fourth place

Final

Statistics

Awards

Final standings

Qualifying 3

Results
All times are JST (UTC+09:00).

Preliminary round

Matches

Classification round

Fifth and sixth place

Third and fourth place

Final

Statistics

Awards

Final standings

References

External links
Official website (Qualifying 1)
Official website (Qualifying 2)
Official website (Qualifying 3)

 
2012 Qualifying Tournaments
2012 Qualifying Tournaments
2012 Qualifying Tournaments
2012 in women's field hockey
hockey
hockey
hockey
2012